Hope Olson may refer to:

 Hope A. Olson, a library scholar known for her critical analyses of classification systems
 Hope Olson (born April 4, 1956), an American model